Handong Sun is a Singaporean physicist currently at Nanyang Technological University and an Elected Fellow of the American Physical Society.

References

Year of birth missing (living people)
Living people
Fellows of the American Physical Society
Singaporean physicists